San Daniele del Friuli is a comune (municipality) in the Province of Udine in the Italian region Friuli Venezia Giulia, located about  northwest of Trieste and about  northwest of Udine.

San Daniele del Friuli borders these municipalities: Dignano, Forgaria nel Friuli, Majano, Osoppo, Pinzano al Tagliamento, Ragogna, Rive d'Arcano, and Spilimbergo.

San Daniele is best known as the production center of the San Daniele prosciutto The prosciutto is celebrated every summer at the end of June during the Aria di Festa.

Main sights
Biblioteca Guarneriana, an old public library, founded in 1466 by Guarnerio d'Artegna, which includes a rare edition of Dante's Inferno from the 14th century
Cathedral of San Michele Arcangelo
Church of Sant'Antonio Abate, housing a precious frescoed chapel known as the "Sistine Chapel of Friuli"
Porta Gemona, designed in 1579 by Andrea Palladio in a tower which is a relic of the old medieval castle

Culture

Sports 
San Daniele is home to a semi-professional football team, A.S.D. San Daniele Calcio which currently plays in the Prima Categoria level of Italian football. The Team plays its home matches at the Lino Zanussi Stadium.

Sister cities
 Altkirch, France (1985)
 Millstatt, Austria (1994)
 Hersbruck, Germany (2008)

References

Cities and towns in Friuli-Venezia Giulia